Culture of Ascent is the ninth studio album by American progressive rock band Glass Hammer, released on October 23, 2007. It is a concept album based on Jon Krakauer's novel Into Thin Air.

It was the last album with singer Carl Groves before his departure from the band; he later returned for 2014's Ode to Echo. The album also features Jon Anderson of Yes as a guest vocalist.

Track listing

Personnel 
Glass Hammer
 Carl Groves – lead and backing vocals
 Susie Bogdanowicz – lead and backing vocals
 Fred Schendel – keyboards, organs, piano, Mellotron, loops, programming, acoustic guitar, string arrangement, backing vocals
 Steve Babb – bass, pipe organ, percussion, Mellotron, piano, harp, loops, programming, Minimoog and backing vocals

 Additional musicians
 Matt Mendians – drums
 David Walliman – electric guitars
 The Adonia String Trio – string trio
 Rebecca James – violin
 Susan Whitacre – viola
 Rachel Beckmann – cello
 Sarah Snyder – backing vocals
 Eric Parker – acoustic guitar
 Robert Streets – backing vocals
 Haley McGuire – backing vocals
 Jon Anderson – vocalizations
 Fred Schendel and Steve Babb – production
 Bob Katz – mastering
 Michal Karcz – artwork, cover

References 

2007 albums
Glass Hammer albums